Shamsul Haque is a Bangladesh Awami League politician and the former Member of Parliament of Mymensingh-10.

Career
Haque was elected to parliament from Mymensingh-10 as a Bangladesh Awami League candidate in 1973.

References

Awami League politicians
Living people
1st Jatiya Sangsad members
Year of birth missing (living people)
People from Mymensingh Division
20th-century Bengalis